Frank Alexander may refer to:

Frank Alexander (actor) (1879–1937), American silent film comedian and actor
Frank Alexander (cricketer) (1911–2005), Australian cricketer
Frank A. Alexander (born 1937), American Thoroughbred horse racing trainer
Frank S. Alexander (born 1952), professor of law at the Emory University School of Law
Frank Alexander (American football) (born 1989), American football player
Frank Alexander (veterinarian) (1917–1998), British veterinarian
Sir Frank Alexander, 1st Baronet, British shipowner and shipbroker

See also

Francis Alexander (disambiguation)